Sipho Ngwenya was the first democratically elected mayor of the Greater city of  Durban.  He was the first black mayor of the city  post Apartheid era of South Africa.  Durban, South Africa's third largest city, saw a number of name changes from Greater City of Durban to Durban UniCity before the current and final, eThekwini Metropolitan Municipality.

Sipho Ngwenya was a member of Inkatha Freedom Party when he was elected as mayor, he was the first citizen of Durban for 2 of the first 5-year democratic term. During South Africa's first democratic elections of 1994, the province of KwaZulu-Natal was won by Inkatha Freedom Party. in the year 1996, the Greater City of Durban was restructured to form the Durban UniCity where an African National Congress 1994 mayoral candidate Obed Mlaba was then appointed the mayor.

In the  year 2003, a constitutional amendment by the South African parliament called Floor crossing (South Africa) was passed. Sipho Ngwenya was one of the first high profile politicians who utilized this bill and crossed from Inkatha Freedom Party to the African National Congress

References

Year of birth missing (living people)
Living people
Mayors of Durban
Inkatha Freedom Party politicians
African National Congress politicians